Bresha Webb (born Breshae Renee Webb; May 6, 1984) is an American actress. She starred as Imunique Jefferson in the TV One comedy series Love That Girl! from 2010 to 2014. She later has appeared in films Meet the Blacks (2016), Acrimony (2018), Night School (2018), Sextuplets (2019), and A Fall from Grace (2020).

Early life
Webb was born in Baltimore, Maryland, to Garfield and Shea Webb. In 2002, she graduated high school from Baltimore School for the Arts. She says that her parents have been a strong support system for her and that actors such as Angela Bassett and Will Smith were positive influences for her to pursue acting and comedy. She is a devout Christian. She has stated that she has a strong belief in keeping God first in her life and believes in prayer. In 2007, she graduated from California Institute of the Arts with BFA in acting.

Career
Webb began her career appearing on television. From 2008 to 2009, she had a recurring role as Dr. Laverne St. John in the NBC medical drama series, ER. In 2010, she was cast opposite Tatyana Ali in the TV One comedy series Love That Girl!. After three seasons of being a part of the main cast of Love That Girl!, it was announced that Webb had been upgraded to the leading role of the television series after former lead actress Tatyana Ali was prevented from returning due to contractual obligations to the now cancelled BET television show, Second Generation Wayans.  In 2013, Webb featured on a special showcase of Saturday Night Live that focused on female comedians of African American descent. In 2014, she went to star in the ABC comedy pilot Keep It Together produced by Kevin Hart. Also in 2014, she had a recurring role in the ABC medical drama series, Grey's Anatomy playing Teresa Morris.

In 2015, Webb starred in the short-lived NBC sitcom Truth Be Told . From 2017 to 2018, she starred in the another NBC sitcom, Marlon, opposite Marlon Wayans and Essence Atkins. The series was canceled after two seasons. In film, Webb starred in the 2014  independent horror Hollows Grove. In 2016, she appeared in the comedy films Ride Along 2 starring Kevin Hart and Meet the Blacks opposite Mike Epps. In 2018, she appeared in the thriller Acrimony starring Taraji P. Henson, and had supporting role opposite Kevin Hart and Tiffany Haddish in the comedy film Night School. In 2019, she took a female leading role opposite Marlon Wayans in the comedy film Sextuplets. The following year, she starred opposite Crystal R. Fox in the thriller film A Fall from Grace. She later was cast in the Starz comedy series, Run the World.

Filmography

Film

Television/web

Video games

References

External links
 
Bresha Webb Website

Living people
1984 births
American film actresses
American television actresses
21st-century American actresses
American video game actresses
American voice actresses
African-American actresses
African-American Christians
Actresses from Baltimore
21st-century African-American women
20th-century African-American people
20th-century African-American women